Sons of Ben may refer to:
 Sons of Ben (literary group), term applied to followers of Ben Jonson in English poetry and drama in the first half of the seventeenth century
 Sons of Ben (MLS supporters association), a supporters organization for the Philadelphia Union MLS soccer team which began play in 2010